Gary Chester (born Cesario Gurciullo; October 27, 1924 – August 17, 1987) was an American studio drummer, author, and teacher. Beginning in the 1960s, he played on hundreds of records for bands such as The Coasters, The Monkees, and The Lovin' Spoonful.

Biography
Born in the Bronx to parents who emigrated from Syracuse, Sicily, Chester's first successful recording session was when he replaced a studio drummer.

As his reputation grew, Chester became a respected teacher, with drummers searching out his expertise and demanding techniques. His drumming systems have been used and endorsed by drummers such as Kenny Aronoff, Gary Gibbons, Douglas Oscard, Danny Gottlieb, Max Weinberg, Chris Adams, Tico Torres, Lindy Morrison, and Dave Weckl, each having studied under Chester.

Instruction technique

Ostinato 
Chester devised a system involving internalized patterns employing a drum 'melody' in an attempt to expand drummers' coordination and groove ability. His use of the ostinato figure employed more than repetition; he created drum melodies for a song with variation and development of the drum phrase or motif using the entire drum kit.  He advocated alternating an ostinato line to fit changing harmonies or keys to enhance the song. Chester's system also taught how to set up an ostinato with one limb or more and playing freely with the remaining limbs, allowing one drummer to sound like a small percussion section.

Ambidexterity and rhythmic vocalization 
Chester focused on teaching skills like creativity, improvisation, four-limb independence and ambidexterity, cross-dominance, playing solid time, alignment of limbs, and making an independent contribution to the song while playing to match the song rather than playing to show off. For example, his instructional techniques included learning to overcome students' natural handedness (or laterality) by playing both right-handed and left-handed.  This offered the studio pro greater flexibility, smoother groove transition, and a more complex, unbroken riff or fill. This ambidexterity also permitted the drummer to switch the ostinato from right-to-left or vice versa, thereby letting the free hand (or foot) develop a richer drum melody. One additional benefit was more open handed drumming which increases hand mobility around the set as the drummer does not need to cross and uncross his or her arms as often.

The core concept of Chester's New Breed instruction style was five-way independence. The student was given a system (three parts of a rhythm) and was required to play a written melody with the fourth limb. Chester also taught his students to "sing" each part that each limb played (rhythmic vocalization) while drumming to "train your ears to accept and understand what you’re doing." While coordinating and reading, the student would also be required to sing the quarter note, back beat, up beat and the melody for each system. Once the student performed each two page written melody and sang four different parts, he/she was required to play the same exercise with a left hand lead. Here, countless new rhythms were played, read, coordinated in time to a metronome, while singing.  As a result of Chester's instructional techniques, the student would:
(a) Develop independent four-way coordination;
(b) Master sight reading ability and note recognition
(c) Left hand would now be able to play ride patterns
(d) Control time keeping through metronome and singing (by singing the quarter note, one could always play in time)
(e) By gaining the ability to play and sing the melodies written, the student enhanced creativity and musicianship. If one could play what one sang, all playing situations became a breeze.

Books
 New Breed
 New Breed II

Selected discography

Selected album recordings 
 Spanish Harlem - Ben E. King (1961)
 Solomon Burke - Solomon Burke (1962)
 The Electrifying Aretha Franklin - Aretha Franklin (1962)
 If You Need Me - Solomon Burke (1963)
 Young Boy Blues - Ben E. King (1964)
 Unforgettable: A Tribute to Dinah Washington - Aretha Franklin (1964)
 New York Tendaberry - Laura Nyro (1969)
 And Now We Come to Distances - Gloria Loring (1969)
 Aerie - John Denver (1971)
 Poems, Prayers & Promises - John Denver (1971)
 You Don't Mess Around with Jim - Jim Croce (1972)
 Rocky Mountain High - John Denver (1972)
 Life and Times - Jim Croce (1973)
 Farewell Andromeda - John Denver (1973)
 I Got a Name - Jim Croce (1973)

References

External links 
Drum Solo Artist
Rainbowpuddle

1924 births
1987 deaths
American session musicians
American rock drummers
Rhythm and blues drummers
Italian emigrants to the United States
American music educators
20th-century American drummers
American male drummers
20th-century American male musicians